Princess Ozma is a fictional character from the Land of Oz, created by American author L. Frank Baum. She appears in every book of the Oz series except the first, The Wonderful Wizard of Oz (1900).

She is the rightful ruler of Oz, and Baum indicated that she would reign in the fairyland forever, being immortal.

Baum described her physical appearance in detail, in The Marvelous Land of Oz: "Her eyes sparkled as two diamonds, and her lips were tinted like a tourmaline. All adown her back floated tresses of ruddy gold, with a slender jeweled circlet confining them at the brow." As originally illustrated by John R. Neill, she fit this description; however, in most subsequent Oz books, Ozma's hair became darker.

The classic books 
Ozma is the daughter of the former King Pastoria of Oz. As an infant, she was given to the witch Mombi of the North by the Wizard of Oz. Mombi transformed Ozma into a boy and called him "Tip" (short for Tippetarius) in order to prevent the rightful ruler of Oz from ascending to the throne. Ozma spent her entire childhood with Mombi in the form of the boy Tip and had no memory of ever having been a girl. During this time, Tip had managed to create Jack Pumpkinhead who was brought to life by Mombi's Powder of Life. In The Marvelous Land of Oz, Glinda the Good Sorceress discovered what had happened and forced Mombi to turn Tip back into Ozma. Since then, the Princess has possessed the Throne of Oz (although many realms within Oz remained unaware of her authority).

In some of his last Oz books, namely The Tin Woodman of Oz and Glinda of Oz, L. Frank Baum indicated that Ozma has the appearance of a fourteen-year-old and is therefore older than Dorothy Gale. By that point in time, Baum had also established that the inhabitants of Oz cease to age, suggesting that Ozma would always appear to be an extremely beautiful young girl.

Baum was not inclined to worry about strict continuity in his series, however, and so there were discrepancies in the origins and very nature of Ozma. In her initial appearances, she was portrayed as no more than a human princess, born shortly before the Wizard's arrival in Oz. Later in the series, Baum revealed that Ozma is actually a fairy, descending from "a long line of fairy queens" as stated in The Scarecrow of Oz. In The Magic of Oz, Glinda tells Dorothy that no one knows how old Ozma really is. And in Baum's final book, Ozma herself explains that she was in fact a member of the Fairy Queen Lurline's band when Lurline enchanted Oz and turned it into a fairyland.

Jack Snow attempted to reconcile Baum's disparate accounts in The Shaggy Man of Oz, which explains that the Fairy Queen Lurline had left the infant Ozma in the care of King Pastoria, making the Princess the adopted daughter of the last King of Oz. This does not gel with the version of Ozma's story which says she is an ageless fairy who has ruled Oz for centuries.

Ozma frequently encounters difficulties while ruling her kingdom. In The Lost Princess of Oz, for instance, the Fairy Princess is kidnapped, although her dearest friend Dorothy comes to her rescue with a search party. Both Dorothy and Ozma are captured by the wicked Queen Coo-ee-oh in Glinda of Oz, while trying to stop a war between two races, but Glinda manages to save them with the help of the Three Adepts at Sorcery. In order to circumvent trouble, Ozma prohibits anyone other than the Wizard of Oz and Glinda from practicing magic in Oz unless they have a permit.

L. Frank Baum portrayed Ozma as an exceedingly benevolent and compassionate ruler, who never resorts to violence and who does not believe in destroying even her worst enemies. In Ozma of Oz, she even left Oz in order to rescue the Royal Family of Ev from the clutches of the Nome King, demonstrating that her kindness and concern extends far beyond her own kingdom. When the Nome King tried to conquer and destroy Oz in revenge, Ozma insisted on maintaining a pacifist disposition, which led to the Scarecrow's suggestion that Ozma's enemies be made to forget about their wicked intentions by drinking from the Fountain of Oblivion.

Furthermore, Ozma discontinued the use of money in Oz, and took systematic measures to ensure that all the citizens of Oz receive the land's resources in equal measure, without having to work harder than necessary.

Ozma invited several people from the outside world to come live in the Land of Oz, most notably Dorothy, The Wizard, Aunt Em, Uncle Henry, Betsy Bobbin, Trot, Button Bright and Cap'n Bill.

According to the timeline of The Road to Oz, Ozma's birthday falls on August 21.

Relationship with Dorothy

When Ozma first meets Dorothy, Oz's greatest heroine,  in Ozma of Oz, they immediately like each other and become best friends; in the canonical Oz books by Baum, Dorothy and Ozma are each other's closest relationship.

In The Emerald City of Oz Ozma arranges, at Dorothy's request, for Dorothy and her family to move into the palace, and Ozma declares her an official princess of Oz and her "constant companion". In The Lost Princess of Oz the first page mentions that Ozma loves Dorothy very much and by page two says that Dorothy is the only one privileged to enter Ozma's rooms without an invitation. In turn, Dorothy often represents Ozma when some task takes the latter away from the Emerald City.

Ozma and Tip

Ozma was born a girl but was magically transformed into a boy named Tip while an infant to hide her from Glinda the Good. Tip was raised as a boy until his early teens, at which point, after the adventures detailed in The Marvelous Land of Oz, Tip is informed that he was born a girl. After some trepidation, Tip agreed to be transformed back into a girl and assumes rule of The Land of Oz as Princess Ozma.

In Windham Classics' adaptation of the Oz books, Tip is made monarch of Oz and no reference at all is made to Ozma.

Jack Snow, Melody Grandy, and Scott Andrew Hutchins have all made divergent attempts to bring Tip back alongside Ozma.  Snow's device, which Hutchins followed as if canon, was that Tip seized his life from Ozma, but that Glinda and the Wizard were able to restore them both and make them siblings. Grandy made the characters totally unrelated through the use of a "Switcheroo Spell", with Ozma unrelated to Tippetarius and therefore suitable as a possible love interest.  Snow's story, "A Murder in Oz" (1956) was rejected by Ellery Queen's Mystery Magazine and published in The Baum Bugle. Grandy's The Disenchanted Princess of Oz has been published by Tails of the Cowardly Lion and Friends. Hutchins's Tip of Oz, heavily mulling over ideas such as Pastoria-as-tailor and the execution of Mombi in The Lost King of Oz and similar material in The Giant Horse of Oz, received a one-paragraph citation in Eldred v. Ashcroft, and remains unpublished under the Copyright Term Extension Act.

Other appearances
Ozma is portrayed by Blanche Deyo in the 1905 musical The Woggle-Bug.
In a 1914 film created by Baum's film company, The Patchwork Girl of Oz, Ozma, played by Jessie May Walsh, appears briefly to preside over Ojo's trial. At the beginning of this film, as well as Baum's His Majesty, the Scarecrow of Oz, Ozma's smiling countenance (being the face of Vivian Reed) appears.
Annette Funicello played her in a 1957 pilot segment for the proposed Walt Disney production, Rainbow Road to Oz.
Shirley Temple, having reportedly been considered for the role of Dorothy Gale in the 1939 movie musical The Wizard of Oz but passed over in favor of Judy Garland, eventually portrayed Princess Ozma in a 1960 television production of The Marvelous Land of Oz, in which she also portrayed Tip.
Ozma appears briefly in Barry Mahon's 1969 The Wonderful Land of Oz, portrayed by Joy Webb.
Christopher Passi cameoed as Ozma after portraying Tip for the duration of a filmed stage version of The Marvelous Land of Oz by Thomas W. Olson, Gary Briggle, and Richard Dworsky in 1981 by The Children's Theatre Company and School of Minneapolis.
Joan Gerber voiced Ozma in 1980's Thanksgiving special Dorothy in the Land of Oz.
In the direct-to-video animated short Dorothy meets Ozma of Oz, an abridged but faithful adaptation of the book Ozma of Oz, Ozma's voice is provided by either Nancy Chance or Sandra J. Butcher (the credits do not specify).
Ozma was portrayed by Emma Ridley in 1985's Return to Oz (which was a blending of elements from the books  Ozma of Oz and The Marvelous Land of Oz) while Walter Murch's daughter Beatrice dubbed her lines. Ridley's version fit Baum's original description of Ozma. Her Earth appearance is an unnamed girl in a Dr. J.B. Worley's hospital who tips off Dorothy about Dr. Worley's machines making the patients brain dead. Both of them escape from the hospital while evading Nurse Wilson only for the two of them to fall into the river where the girl wasn't seen emerging from the surface. In Oz, Princess Ozma is shown trapped in the mirror by Princess Mombi as her reflection leads Dorothy to the Powder of Life. Following the death of the Nome King and the imprisonment of Mombi, Dorothy frees Princess Ozma who forgives Mombi and uses the ruby slippers to send Dorothy back to Kansas. Dorothy sees Princess Ozma and Billina in the mirror as she advises Dorothy to keep the truth about the Land of Oz a secret from Aunt Em and Uncle Henry. A deleted scene following Dorothy's return to Kansas has Aunt Em telling the passing police officer that the girl that escaped with Dorothy hasn't been found.
In the Japanese animated series The Wonderful Wizard of Oz, Ozma's transformation into Tip was so thorough that, despite bearing almost no physical resemblance whatever to Tip, she is a tomboy for a long while and only well into the last story arc of the series comes into her own as a princess.
In The Oz Kids, Andrea (Shay Astar), Glinda's ambivalent daughter, bases her fashion, but little else, on Ozma, who never appeared in the series.
Ozma also appears in the Russian animated Adventures in the Emerald City: Princess Ozma (2000) based on The Marvelous Land of Oz as well as in the 1987 Canadian Dorothy Meets Ozma of Oz based on Ozma of Oz and a 2005 direct to video CGI version of The Patchwork Girl of Oz where she is voiced by Lisa Rosenstock.
In Lost in Oz, an unaired 2002 pilot for a Warner Brothers drama show, Ozma appeared as a young, helpless girl kept eternally young by the Wicked Witch of the West. The main characters of that show rescued her and returned her to the good witch. However, throughout the show, she does not have any lines.
In Dorothy and the Wizard of Oz, Ozma is voiced by Kari Wahlgren (who also voices Dorothy Gale). After she was formerly trapped by the Nome King, Dorothy rescued Ozma and she took her rightful place as queen.
In Emerald City, Tip/Ozma is played by Jordan Loughran.

In other works
In the Vertigo comic book series Fables, Ozma appears as one of the magicians and witches led by Frau Totenkinder. She first appears as an unnamed blonde girl, but in a one-page comic handed out at the 2009 Comic-Con she is seen to be wearing a belt resembling the Magic Belt from the Oz books and mentions she is "not so young." She is also wearing large flowers in her hair, similar to the depiction of Ozma in the books. Later, in issue #87 (October 2009) Frau Totenkinder actually addresses her as "sweet little Ozma."  Later on, she is proven to be Ozma, and to be a powerful enough witch to lead the Fable community's magic-users, after Frau Totenkinder leaves unexpectedly.
Tip makes a cameo appearance In Son of a Witch, the second volume of "The Wicked Years", Gregory Maguire's revisionist take on Oz. Liir (son of Elphaba, the Wicked Witch of the West) briefly encounters Tip and Mombi (the latter unnamed, but with a description matching Baum's and leading the four-horned cow mentioned on the first page of The Marvelous Land of Oz). Tip suggests to Mombi that she sell him to Liir, but Liir replies, "I don't buy children.... I can't save anyone. You have to save yourself."
Tip and Mombi (respelled "Mombey" by Maguire) play a larger role In Out of Oz, the fourth and final volume of "The Wicked Years". In Out of Oz, Tip first appears as a runaway in the city of Shiz and is befriended by Rain (daughter of Liir and granddaughter of Elphaba), and flees the city with her. Later, when Liir is abducted by thugs in Mombey's employ (and transformed into an Elephant), Tip returns to Mombey hoping to secure Liir's release. Near the novel's conclusion, Tip and Rain are reunited and have just finished making love while Mombey performs a spell called "To Call the Lost Forward", in order to return Liir to his proper form; the spell inadvertently also returns Tip to his true form (Ozma) and restores Rain's natural green skin. Although the circumstances of the spell are quite different from those in The Marvelous Land of Oz, details of it closely resemble Baum's description and the illustration of Mombi's spell by John R. Neill. In Maguire's version of Oz, Mombey has kept Ozma in the form of the boy Tip for almost a century.
 In the superhero novel series Wearing the Cape by Marion G. Harmon, a character named Ozma appears in the third book, Young Sentinels. According to the book's narrator, Astra, she is a supernatural breakthrough (person who has developed superpowers) who genuinely believes herself to be the character Princess Ozma of Oz; it is unknown whether she was manifested into reality by an unknown person's breakthrough or if the breakthrough transformed the person into the Ozma character. She becomes a member of Astra's team of Young Sentinels and often explains the differences between Baum's description of events to what she believes really occurred in the Oz books.
 In the Dorothy Must Die series by Danielle Paige, Ozma plays a key role. Although officially the heir to the throne of Oz, after Dorothy is corrupted by magic and takes the throne for herself, Ozma is driven insane and reduced to babbling nonsense, with her past experience as 'Tip' resulting in her magic manifesting a completely separate soul in the form of 'Pete', a boy about the same age as Ozma is more mentally stable. In the second book in the series, The Wicked Will Rise, Pete betrays the Order of the Wicked to Glinda and Dorothy as he fears that the characters intend to 'kill' him to restore Ozma, resulting in the Order losing several members. In The Yellow Brick War, Ozma is able to regain some of her mental strength after new series protagonist Amy Gumm uses the magic of Dorothy's old silver shoes to separate Ozma and Pete into separate entities, rather than two souls in one body.
In Final Fantasy IX, there is a secret enemy boss called Ozma accessible through the Chocobo digging sidequest.
In Jonathan Green's gamebook The Wicked Wizard of Oz, Ozma's appearance is used by an impostor as a disguise; what happened to the real Ozma is left to speculation.
The American animated web series RWBY features an homage to Tip, in the form of main character Oscar Pine, who is the current incarnation of the warrior Ozma.

Influence
Ozma was a direct influence on the design of the protagonist Padme Amidala in the Star Wars prequel trilogy. In a 2022 interview with Star Wars Insider, concept artist Iain McCaig related the instructions that Lucasfilm provided its artists to visualize characters, saying, "Amidala was described as 'Kind of like Ozma' from The Wizard of Oz." According to McCaig, he chose actress Natalie Portman as a model for his designs because he felt evoked the Oz character, saying, "She had Ozma's aura of vulnerability and strength." After producer/director George Lucas spoke with McCaig about this inspiration, Lucas cast Portman to play her.

See also

Project Ozma
The Heart of Princess Osra (1896), a prequel to The Prisoner of Zenda

References

Oz (franchise) characters
Female characters in literature
Literary characters introduced in 1904
Oz (franchise) characters who use magic
Fictional characters with immortality
Fictional fairies and sprites
Fictional princesses
Child characters in literature
Child characters in film
Child characters in animated films
Female characters in film
Female characters in musical theatre
Child characters in musical theatre